Dimitrios Diamantopoulos (born 18 November 1988) is a Greek professional footballer who plays as a centre forward.

Career
Born in Thessaloniki, Diamantopoulos started his career in the youth teams of PAOK. He signed his first professional contract in 2007 for local club Thermaikos – during his two-year stay, he made a total of 42 appearances and scored 7 goals in the Football League 2. In 2009, he moved to another Football League 2 side, Eordaikos, where he made 26 appearances and scored 6 goals.

In 2010, he moved to Veria in the Football League, where he stayed for 18 months with no goals scored in 14 appearances. In January 2012 he moved to Fokikos of the same league, for which he made 20 appearances, scoring 6 goals and being one of the masterminds of the team's performance in the second half of the 2011–12 season, where the newly promoted club narrowly escaped relegation.

In July 2012 he moved to Kerkyra in the Greek Superleague.
He played for six months in Kerkyra and then moved to various Football League clubs, namely Apollon Kalamarias, Doxa Drama, Olympiakos Volou and Agrotikos Asteras. On 27 June 2016, he signed a two-year contract with Apollon Smyrni. However after the end of the season he left the team, as he wasn't part of the coach's future plans.

Aris
On 12 July 2017 he signed a two-year contract with Aris. On 12 November, the 29-year-old striker scored a brace helping his club to seal a 2-0 home win against Kallithea, which were his first goals of the 2017-18 season. One week later he scored with a penalty in a dramatic 3-2 away win against Ergotelis, after a catastrophic first half in which his team were two goals down. On 10 December he scored in a difficult 2-1 away win against Doxa Drama. On 14 January 2018 he sealed a 2-0 away win against Apollon Larissa. On 10 February, he scored in the 89th minute in a 3-1 away win against Panserraikos. On 25 February, he was the MVP of a 4-1 away win against Aiginiakos, scoring a brace. On 24 March, he scored a brace helping his club to escape with a 3-2 win against Kissamikos in its rally to win promotion to the Superleague. On 15 April, he scored twice in a 5-2 home win against Panegialios. Ten days later, he scored another two goals in a 3-0 home win against Apollon Larissa. On 16 May, he scored a brace against Sparti, improving his tally to 16 goals.

On 31 October 2018, he scored both goals in a 2-1 home win against Aittitos Spata in the group stages of the 2018–19 Greek Cup. It was his first appearance of the season. On 9 December, Diamantopoulos scored his first ever Superleague goal in a disappointing 4-2 away loss against Atromitos.

References

External links

1988 births
Living people
Greek footballers
Association football forwards
Super League Greece players
PAOK FC players
Veria F.C. players
Fokikos A.C. players
A.O. Kerkyra players
Apollon Pontou FC players
Olympiacos Volos F.C. players
Apollon Smyrnis F.C. players
Doxa Drama F.C. players
Aris Thessaloniki F.C. players
Footballers from Thessaloniki